Khun Lo, legendary founder of the city of Luang Prabang, was the eldest of the seven sons of the Khun Borom, and is credited as being the first of the prehistoric Lao monarchs. The royal families of Laos trace their lineage to him.

Khun Lo died in 780 and was succeeded by Khun Sung.

References

780 deaths
History of Laos
Laotian royalty
Year of birth unknown
8th-century Tai people
House of Ngamlert ?